Guillermo Vilas defeated John Marks in the final, 6–4, 6–4, 3–6, 6–3 to win the men's singles tennis title at the 1978 Australian Open.

Vitas Gerulaitis was the defending champion, but did not compete this year.

This tournament was the final major appearance for former four-time champion Ken Rosewall.

Seeds
The seeded players are listed below. Guillermo Vilas is the champion; others show the round in which they were eliminated.

  Guillermo Vilas (champion)
  José Luis Clerc (first round)
  Arthur Ashe (semifinals)
  Tim Gullikson (second round)
  Wojtek Fibak (third round)
  John Alexander (quarterfinals)
  Ken Rosewall (third round)
  Victor Amaya (second round)
  Hank Pfister (semifinals)
  Yannick Noah (first round)
  Tony Roche (quarterfinals)
  Peter Feigl (quarterfinals)
  Kim Warwick (third round)
  Geoff Masters (first round)
  Bernard Mitton (second round)
  Allan Stone (third round)

Qualifying

Draw

Finals

Section 1

Section 2

Section 3

Section 4

External links
 Association of Tennis Professionals (ATP) – 1978 Australian Open Men's Singles draw
 1978 Australian Open – Men's draws and results at the International Tennis Federation

Mens singles
Australian Open (tennis) by year – Men's singles